Christian Sylvester Sands (born May 22, 1989) is an American jazz pianist and composer. His third album for Mack Avenue Records, Be Water, was released in 2020 and received a Grammy Award nomination in the Best Instrumental Composition category for the song "Be Water II."

Life and career

Sands was born on May 22, 1989. He grew up in New Haven, Connecticut, and later moved to the nearby town of Orange. He started playing the piano at a very young age, and took lessons from the age of four; he commented that "I grew up with it in the house, in the classroom and on stage so it has always been a huge part of my life".

Sands was mentored by pianist Billy Taylor, who allowed the teenager to close one of the sets that Taylor played at the Kennedy Center. Sands went on to study at the Manhattan School of Music. The school's Afro-Cuban Jazz Orchestra, led by Bobby Sanabria, recorded the album Kenya Revisited Live in 2009; it was nominated for a Latin Grammy.

After graduating, Sands joined Inside Straight, one of bassist Christian McBride's bands; they have toured internationally.

Sands became a Steinway artist in 2012. In 2014, Sands cited as influences McBride, Wynton Marsalis, Kenny Garrett, and Marcus Roberts, because "They're coming from the tradition of bringing people into the music, but also moving it forward into new directions". In the same year, Sands became an American Pianists Association Jazz Fellowship Awards Finalist.

Discography
An asterisk (*) indicates that the year is that of release.

As leader

As sideman

References

1989 births
African-American jazz musicians
American jazz pianists
American male pianists
Jazz musicians from Connecticut
Living people
Manhattan School of Music alumni
Musicians from New Haven, Connecticut
Place of birth missing (living people)
21st-century American pianists
21st-century American male musicians
American male jazz musicians
Mack Avenue Records artists
Storyville Records artists
African-American pianists
21st-century African-American musicians
20th-century African-American people